The 2015–16 Moldovan National Division is the 25th season of top-tier football in Moldova. The competition began in July 2015 and will end in May 2016. Milsami Orhei are the defending champions.

Teams
FC Petrocub Hîncești, runners-up of the 2014–15 "A" Division, promoted to the National Division for the first time since the 2002–03 season. Speranța Nisporeni, which became third in the 2014–15 "A" Division, returns to the highest level for the first time since the 1997–98 season. Both teams achieved their second consecutive promotion. The champions of the 2014–15 "A" Division, FC Sheriff-2, are not allowed to play in the same league as the first Sheriff team, and thus were not promoted.

Stadia and locations

Personnel and sponsorship

Managerial changes

League table

Gold Match
The gold match was played on 29 May 2016 at Zimbru Stadium. The "home" team (for administrative purposes) was determined by an additional draw held on 22 May 2016.

Results
The schedule consists of three rounds. During the first two rounds, each team plays each other once home and away for a total of 18 matches. The pairings of the third round will then be set according to the standings after the first two rounds, giving every team a third game against each opponent for a total of 27 games per team.

First and second round

Third round

Goalscoring

Top goalscorers
Updated to matches played on 30 May 2016.

Hat-tricks

Top assists
Updated to matches played on 30 May 2016.

Clean sheets

Disciplinary

Attendances 

Updated to matches played on 24 May 2016.

References

External links
 Official website
 uefa.com

National Division 2015-16
Moldovan Super Liga seasons
Moldova 1